Adventure Theater is a dramatic anthology series that aired on NBC from June 16, 1956, through September 1, 1956. The series was produced in England in 1953, but was never broadcast there as a series.  It was also known as Calling Scotland Yard.

Series structure
Actor Paul Douglas was the program's host and introduced each of the two-act plays that composed the series. Each introduction involved a memento or souvenir that he had brought back from England.  The story about the object led into that week's episode.

Cast
With the exception of Douglas, all of the featured cast members were British actors and included Hugh Latimer, Laurence Naismith, Anthony Nicholls, Derek Blomfield, Jack Watling, Maurice Denham, Robert Raglan, Hazel Court, Derek Bond and Kay Walsh.

Broadcast history
Sponsored by the American Tobacco Company and Hudnut, the series was broadcast in 1956 on Saturday evenings as a summer replacement for Your Hit Parade. The series returned in 1957 with repeats of the original 13 episodes.

Episodes
Some of the episodes were re-titled for broadcast in the United States.
"The Missing Passenger" (also known as "Ladies of Leisure")
"Falstaff's Fur Coat"
"The Thief of London"
"Thirty Days to Die"
"The Wedding Gift" (also known as "Present for a Bride")
"The Final Twist"
"The Javanese Dagger"
"The Ripper Strikes"
"The Wilful Widow"
"The Stranger on the Sea"
"The Corpse of Pleasant Avenue"
"The Man Who Stayed Alive"
"The Sable Scarf"

Film adaptations

Two films were made from the series for release in UK theaters in 1954, each comprising three episodes from the series, linked by Gilbert Harding.

Gilbert Harding Speaking of Murder
Featuring the episodes:
"The Missing Passenger"
"Falstaff's Fur Coat", starring H. Marion Crawford
"Thirty Days to Die"

Tale of Three Women

The Wedding Gift
A man marries off his girlfriend to a wealthy diamond merchant then murders him.

Cast
Hazel Court as Trude
Derek Bond as Max
David Horne as Hines
Oliver Johnston as Butler

The Thief of London
A professional pickpocket makes his gift pay.

Cast
Jack Watling as Dick
Gene Anderson as Pamela
Peter Gawthorne as Sir Frederick
Helene Cordet as Maria
Michael Ripper as Simpkins

The Final Twist
A jeweller robs himself and commits murder.

Cast
Karel Stepanek as Alfred Dykemann
Catherine Finn as Joanna, his dyke
Philip Leaver as Groote
Patricia Owens as Mary
Gordon McLeon as Counsel
Robert Perceval as Inspector Clarke
Digby Wolfe as Brightwell

References

External links

Adventure Theater at CTVA

1956 American television series debuts
1956 American television series endings
1950s American anthology television series
1950s American drama television series
Black-and-white American television shows
NBC original programming
English-language television shows